Paul Nicholls may refer to:

Paul Nicholls (actor) (born 1979), English actor
Paul Nicholls (horse racing) (born 1962), British National Hunt horse trainer
Paul Nicholls (sportsman) (1946–2009), Australian cricketer/WAFL footballer

See also
Paul Nichols (born 1981), American college football coach and former player
Paul F. Nichols (born 1952), American politician
Paul Nicolas (1899–1959), French international footballer
Paul Nicholas (born 1944), English actor and singer
Paul Nicholson (disambiguation)